The 1962 National Invitation Tournament was the 1962 edition of the annual NCAA college basketball competition.

Selected teams
Below is a list of the 12 teams selected for the tournament.

 Bradley
 Colorado State
 Dayton
 Duquesne
 Holy Cross
 Houston
 Loyola-Chicago
 Navy
 Providence
 St. John's
 Temple
 Wichita

Bracket
Below is the tournament bracket.

See also
 1962 NCAA University Division basketball tournament
 1962 NCAA College Division basketball tournament
 1962 NAIA Division I men's basketball tournament

References

National Invitation
National Invitation Tournament
1960s in Manhattan
Basketball in New York City
College sports in New York City
Madison Square Garden
National Invitation Tournament
National Invitation Tournament
Sports competitions in New York City
Sports in Manhattan